Nicola Ghiuselev (Bulgarian: Никола Гюзелев) (also Gyuzelev; 17 August 1936 – 16 May 2014) was a Bulgarian operatic bass, particularly associated with the Italian and Russian repertories.

Biography 
Ghiuselev was born on 17 August 1936 in Pavlikeni. He was the son of Nicolai Ghiuselev and Elisaveta Ghiuseleva.  He studied painting at the Academy of Arts in Sofia, and later voice at the school of the National Opera of Sofia, with Christo Brambarov. He made his stage debut with that company, as Timur in Turandot, in 1960. In 1965, with the Sofia Opera, he toured Germany, the Netherlands and France, and made his debut at the Metropolitan Opera of New York,  as Ramfis in Aida, quickly followed by King Philip II in Don Carlo, and the title role in Boris Godunov. In two seasons with the Met, he sang as Raimondo in Lucia di Lammermoor, the Commendatore in Don Giovanni, Colline in La bohème.

Important debuts followed at the Berlin State Opera, La Scala in Milan, the Vienna State Opera, the Monte Carlo Opera, the Palais Garnier in Paris, the Liceo in Barcelona, the San Carlo in Naples, the Royal Opera House in London, the Verona Arena, the Salzburg Festival, the Holland Festival, he also appeared in Moscow, Saint Petersburg, Prague, Budapest, Warsaw, Marseille, Toulouse, Chicago, Houston, among others. 

Other notable roles include; Mephistopheles in Faust, Creonte in Medea, Padre Guardiano in La forza del destino, Banquo in Macbeth, Zaccaria in Nabucco, Silva in Ernani, Enrico in Anna Bolena, Galitzky in Prince Igor, the four villains in The Tales of Hoffmann, Mosè in Mosè in Egitto, Marcel in Les Huguenots, Gremin in Eugene Onegin, etc.

He died on 16 May 2014, aged 77.

Selected recordings
 1967 - La Gioconda - Renata Tebaldi, Carlo Bergonzi, Robert Merrill, Marilyn Horne, Nicola Ghiuselev - Coro e Orchestra dell'Accademia di Santa Cecilia, Lamberto Gardelli - (Decca)
 1969 - Les Huguenots - Joan Sutherland, Martina Arroyo, Huguette Tourangeau, Anastasios Vrenios, Nicola Ghiuselev, Gabriel Bacquier, Dominic Cossa - Ambrosian Opera Chorus, New Philharmonia Orchestra, Richard Bonynge - (Decca)
 1973 - "Boris Godunov" -  Nicola Ghiuselev, Dimeter Damyanov, Alexandrina Milcheva - Sofia National Opera Chorus and Orchestra, Assen Naidenov - (Fidelio)
 1986 - Faust - Alfredo Kraus, Ana Maria Gonzalez, Nicola Ghiuselev, Roberto Coviello - Orchestra Sinfonica dell'Emilia Romagna Arturo Toscanini e Coro del Teatro Regio di Parma, Alain Guingal - (Hardy Classic Video, Milan)

Honours
 Mount Ghiuselev on Brabant Island, Antarctica is named after Nicola Ghiuselev.
 Commendatore dell'Ordine della Stella d'Italia
 Doctor Honoris Causa  of the Bulgarian Academy of Sciences

References

Sources

External links

 His page on the Stars of Bulgarian Opera site with mp3 audio clips of selected arias
 
 
Performance record: Ghiuselev, Nicola on the MetOpera Database

1936 births
2014 deaths
20th-century Bulgarian male opera singers
Operatic basses
Italian-language singers
French-language singers
Russian-language singers
German-language singers
People from Pavlikeni
Place of death missing